"Vater Unser, Part II (Psalm 23)" (ger. "Father of Ours, Part II (Psalm 23)") is the eighth single released by the German music project E Nomine, and appears on the 2004 album Das Beste aus... Gottes Beitrag und Teufels Werk. This tracks is a mix of 'Vater Unser' and 'Psalm 23' from "Das Testament" (1999).

Track listing 

 Vater Unser, Part II (Psalm 23) - Radio Mix (3:54)
 Vater Unser, Part II (Psalm 23) - Extended Mix (5:58)
 Vater Unser - DJ Mellow- D. Remix (6:41)
 Der Ring der Nibelungen (4:23)
 Gebet: Psalm 23 (0:59)

Lyric 
My Lord

Thy Kingdom come

Hallowed be Thy name

So wherever Thy reign

You are my Shepherd

Forever and ever

Amen.

-

-

Dextra, Testare

Dextra, Testare

Sigini

Sempiternus

-

-

Dextra, Testare

Dextra, Testare

Sigini

Sempiternus

-

-

Dextra, Testare

Dextra, Testare

Sigini

Sempiternus

-

My Lord

Thy Kingdom come

Hallowed be Thy name

So wherever Thy reign

You are my Shepherd

Forever and ever

-

Dextra, Testare

Dextra, Testare

Sigini

Sempiternus

-

...

2003 singles
E Nomine songs
2003 songs
Polydor Records singles